Lazaro Openda Tikolo (born 27 December 1964) is a former Kenyan cricketer. He has played three One Day Internationals for Kenya.

His two brothers Tom Tikolo and Steve Tikolo also played for Kenyan team, where Steve is a former captain as well.

References

External links
 

1964 births
Living people
Kenyan cricketers
Kenya One Day International cricketers
Kenyan cricket coaches